Župan is a noble and administrative title used in several states in Central and Southeastern Europe between the 7th century and the 21st century. It was (and in Croatia still is) the leader of the administrative unit župa (or zhupa, županija). The term in turn was adopted by the Hungarians as ispán and spread further.

Origin of the title
The exact origin of the title is not definitively known and there have been several hypotheses: Slavic (Franz Miklosich), Turkic-Avarian (A. Bruckner), Iranian (F. Altheim), Proto Indo-European (V. Machek), Indo-European (D. Dragojević), Illyrian-Thracian (K. Oštir), Old-Balkan (M. Budimir), among others. The title was preserved primarily among the Slavic peoples and their neighbours who were under their influence. Its presence among Pannonian Avars and Avar language is completely undetermined. The title origin is not necessarily related to the origin of the titleholder.

In 2009, A. Alemany considered that the title *ču(b)-pān, often in a northeastern Iranian milleu, had an Eastern and Central Asian derivation, čupan, and a Western and European derivation, župan. The Eastern čupan first occurs, but allegedly as is usually connected with čupan, in a Bactrian contract dated to 588 AD, where are mentioned two "headman" (σωπανο, "sopano"); among the Western Turks (582–657), the leader of the fifth Shunishi Duolu tribe was a chuban chuo (čupan čor), while the leader of the fifth Geshu Nushibi tribe was chuban sijin (čupan irkin), with chuo and sijin being the standard title of the each tribe's leader, inferior to qayan (khagan), but superior to bäg. However, there is no mention of čupan in Old Turkic runic incsriptions; a Chinese document (c. 8th century) near Kucha mentions several persons (allegedly Tocharians) with patronymic Bai and title chuban; in the same century, in the Chinese documents of province Khotan are mentioned word chiban and alleged title of low rank chaupam; the first (Old) Turkic document recording the title čupan is a Uyghur decree from Turpan dated c. 9th–11th century. According to the work Dīwānu l-Luġat al-Turk by the 11th century scholar Mahmud al-Kashgari, a čupan is an assistant to a village headman.

The first known mention of Western župan occurs in a charter of Kremsmünster abbey, by Bavarian duke Tassilo III in 777 AD, in which the monastery was granted by a group of Slavs, headed by the chieftains Taliup and Sparuna, whose abode lied beneath the boundaries reported under oath by the iopan Physso; the zo(ō)apan of Buyla inscription on a buckled bowl of a heterogeneous and chronologically uncertain (7th or 8th century) Treasure of Nagyszentmiklós; the supan in Lusatian and Latin language (7th century): the ζουπανος (zoupanos) on a silver bowl found at Veliki Preslav, capital of First Bulgarian Empire (893–972), and zhupan in Greek stone inscriptions and Cyrillic alphabet (Codex Suprasliensis); the zuppanis in Latin charter of St. George's church at Putalj by Croatian duke Trpimir in 852 AD; the Slavic, generally considered of White Croats, title of king's deputy mentioned by Ibn Rusta in the 10th century, the sūt.ğ or sūb.ğ, of which corrupted text some transcribe as sūbanğ (probably Turkic sū beḫ); according to Constantine VII in his 10th century work De Administrando Imperio, Croats, Serbs and other Slavic nations of Dalmatia had the ζουπάνους (zoupanous), "Princes, as they say, these nations had none, but only župans, elders, as is the rule in the other Slavonic regions"; also the Croatian state was divided in 11 ζουπανίας (zoupanias) administrative regions, with additional three ruled by βοάνος (boanos) or μπάνος (b/mpanos) (Ban); and is individually mentioned ζουπανου (zoupanou) Beloje of Travunia; later among Serbs it also temporary became a title for supreme leader  ζουπανος μεγας (zoupanos megas, Grand Župan); in Czech sources supani (1187).

Etymology
In Belarusian, Czech, Polish, Slovak and Ukrainian allegedly from župan was shortened to pan, meaning "master, mister, sir".

 Franz Altheim derived the title from Iranian etymon *fsu-pāna- that evolved to šuβān in Parthian, šupān and šubān in Persian; all these words meaning "shepherd". Gerhard Doerfer suggested possible Iranian origin for Mahmud al-Kashgari's čupan linking it with New Persian čōpan, a variant form of šubān, with usual change of š- to č-. Omeljan Pritsak in Iranian *fsu-pāna saw "shepherd of (human) cattle" in Avar service, using the Slavic masses as cannon fodder. Some scholars derived it from alleged Old Iranian ašurpan/aszurpan, meaning "great lord, noblemen". It is considered that the title origin can be traced to the Slavic and Iranian cultural interrelation in the Eastern and Southeastern Europe in the first centuries AD.
 Karl Brugmann derived the Common Slavic *županъ from župa "district, small administrative region", < *geupā, comparing this word with Skt. gopā- (herdsman, guardian), derived from gopaya (to guard, protect), of gup-, or even go-pā (cow-herd), Avestan gufra- (deep, hidden), among others. Oleg Trubachyov derived it from *gupana (from gopaya, the guard of cattle). A Central Asian descent was claimed by Karl Heinrich Menges, who considered župan a slavicized form of Altaic čupan (a loanword from Iranian), with modified meaning from "clan, community" to "district". According to research done by scholars Ambroży Bogucki, Bohumil Vykypĕl and Georg Holzer, in 2007 Franjo Smiljanić concluded that is excluded any Avar influence on the origin, yet within the Avar authority were preserved the remnants of Slavic tribal organization.
 According to Alemany, the (Old) Turkic ču(b) is most probably a Turkic loanword from Khotanese -cū and Chinese zhou (prefecture), which was a Chinese territorial administration applied to Central Asian regions inhabited by Iranians, but it has even older meaning of small island; a township unit; a region, up to zhoumu (regional governor) from Han to Sui dynasty. Alemany pointed out that, as there were settlements of Central Asian Iranians at least in some of those zhou, the title čupan as *ču(b)-pān (protecting a ču(b) or zhou), was an Iranian rendering (see marz-bān, "protecting the marches"), of the Chinese zhoumu. The suffix -pān (from Avestan and Old Persian pat, "protector"; pā-, "to protect, to care") is well documented in Manichean Parthian texts from Turpan, and lesser extent in Sogdian and Khotanese. He concluded that the title designs both regio and rector, and if čupan was a loanword introduced by the Avars as some assumed, but there was already a common Slavic word župa, their association could explain the shift č- > ž- in župan.

However, as the title among Avars is undetermined, on the basis of preserved toponyms which are etymologically related to the title župan, like Županovo kolo in Novgorod, Russia, and Župany kolo in Ukraine, as well it was spread in Slavic languages which were not in contact with Avar language, the assumption it was of Avar origin is highly doubtful and dismissed by many scholars as it occurs in wider area than is the area where lived Slavs and Avars together.

Usage of the title and division
The title had a widespread distribution, and did not always have a concrete institutional definition. Slavic tribes were divided into fraternities, each including a certain number of families. The territory inhabited by a tribe was a župa, and its leader was the župan.

The župans, once as kopan, of the First Bulgarian Empire are traditionally seen as Slavic chiefs, or leaders of a local tribe and district. The župan title was also used in Wallachia and Moldavia (in modern Romania) but only with the meaning "mister" and bearing no administrative connotations.

Bosnia

Similarly to Serbia and Croatia, Bosnian rulers of the early Middle Ages were referred to as župan. According to Fine, the governorship was hereditary, and the župan reported to a ban or a king, whom they were obliged to aid in war.

Croatia

As heads of the županija, the most important role of the župans were their public authority function. They were the primates populi, nobile aristocracy from where the king (or duke) recruited the official servants. Those župans by origin most probably belonged to the tribal or noble family structure, in historiography known as the Twelve noble tribes of Croatia, which are mentioned in the Pacta conventa and Supetar Cartulary. In the Supetar Cartulary, and in Croatian redaction of Chronicle of the Priest of Duklja, they were called as nobile sapienciroes and starac (elderman), indicating that to the agreement with king Coloman went twelve "elders župan".

According to the charter by Croatian duke Muncimir (892 AD) it can be identified various official functions; župans who work at the ducal palace (Budimiro zuppani palatii, Prisna maccererarii, Pruade zuppano cauallario, Zelestro zuppano camerario, Zestededo zuppano pincernario, Bolledrago zuppano carnicario, Budimiro zuppano comitisse, Augina zuppano armigeri), who are part of territorial organization (Zelllerico zuppano Cleoniae, Sibidrago zuppano Clesae), or are only noble by position (Petro zuppano, Pribritreco filius Petri zuppano). The župans were usually listed in historical documents only as witnesses, without mark of duty.

The transition of 12th to the 13th century is characterized by terminological change of the title župan and the spreading beyond the tribal main territory. The older social rank of the župan (iupanus) in Latin documents was changed with the title comes. The Latin term comes in the 14th and 15th century Croatia was translated in two different ways, as špan and knez. The first signified the royal official in the županija, while the second the hereditary lord of the županija exempted from the direct royal rule. Thus the term lost its old tribal and got a new administrative meaning, while the old Croatian tribes (genus) under the title of knez preserved the inheritance rights over the lands of županija.

Hungary

There were several "ispán"'s in the royal court of Hungarian Kingdom: 'nádorispán' (palatine), 'udvarispán' (court ispán), 'kápolna ispán' (chapel ispán), and 'ispán's of the financial hierarchy ('harmincadispán', 'pénzverőispán', 'sókamaraispán', 'urburaispán'). Similarly the leaders of the ethnic groups were called 'ispán' like 'besenyők ispánja' (Besermian ispán) 'székelyispán' (Szekler ispán).

Serbia

According to Fine, the governorship was hereditary, and the župan reported to the Serbian prince, whom they were obliged to aid in war. The earlier župan title was abolished and replaced with the Greek-derived kefalija (kephale, "head, master").

Slovakia
The title župan is widely used as an informal name for presidents of self-governing regions (župa) in Slovakia.

Slovenia
In Slovenia, župan is the official title of the mayor of the 212 municipalities. In the Slovene-speaking municipalities in Italy, the term županstvo is used for the municipal administration (similar to the Spanish ayuntamiento), while in Slovenia, this usage is obsolete. Before the 19th century, župan was used as a name for the village elder. With the introduction of modern municipal administration in the Austrian Empire in 1849, it became the official Slovene title for mayors.

The Slovene name for parishes, župnija, has the same etymology. The parish priest is called župnik.

The name županija is used to refer to the counties of Hungary (the term has been historically used by the Prekmurje Slovenes, who were part of the Kingdom of Hungary from the 10th century until 1918).

See also
 Grand Župan, a Bulgarian and Serbian medieval title (equivalent to Grand Prince)
 Gespan
 Ban
 Župa

Notes

Sources

Bosnian noble titles
Bosnian royal titles
Bulgarian noble titles
Croatian noble titles
Gubernatorial titles
Serbian noble titles
Serbian royal titles
Slavic titles
Titles of national or ethnic leadership